Irinel Pănulescu (born 17 June 1964) is a Romanian freestyle and medley swimmer. She competed in three events at the 1980 Summer Olympics.

References

External links
 

1964 births
Living people
Romanian female freestyle swimmers
Romanian female medley swimmers
Olympic swimmers of Romania
Swimmers at the 1980 Summer Olympics
Sportspeople from Ploiești
Universiade medalists in swimming
Universiade silver medalists for Romania